The Arri Alexa is a digital motion picture camera system developed by Arri. First introduced in April 2010, the camera was Arri's first major transition into digital cinematography after previous efforts such as the Arriflex D-20 and D-21.

Alexa cameras are designed for use in feature films, television shows, and commercials. Alexa uses the ALEV series of image sensors manufactured by ON Semiconductor.

Overview

The Alexa camera system introduced their Log-C imaging science as a digital negative to make digital cinema images process like scanned film images.

The camera has several methods of recording, including SxS cards, CFast 2.0 cards and SXR Capture Drives at resolutions up to 3424 × 2202 pixels in either Rec. 709 HD Video color space or Log-C to ProRes or ARRIRAW codecs. The Alexa camera offers additional optional software licenses that unlock different capabilities of the Alexa Camera including High Speed 120fps recording, DNxHD codec and 4:3 "Open Gate" Mode for anamorphic lenses.

The Alexa camera system includes modularity, PL mount lenses, a Super 35 sized CMOS sensor shooting up to 3424×2202 resolution and supports uncompressed video or proprietary raw (ARRIRAW) codec.

The price of the camera depends on model and accessories; as an example in 2015 an Arri Alexa XT cost approximately $66,000-100,000, depending on accessories included.

Model range
The range of Alexa models has expanded over time:

Alexa
The Alexa, announced in April 2010, was the first camera released of the product family. The Alexa's CMOS Super-35mm sensor is rated at 2.8K and ISO 800. That sensitivity allows the camera to see a full seven stops of over exposure and another seven stops of underexposure. To take advantage of this, ARRI offers both industry-standard REC709 HD video output as well as the Log-C mode that shows the entire range of the chip's sensitivity, allowing for an extreme range of color correction options in post.

Alexa Plus (4:3)
The Alexa Plus added integrated wireless remote control, the ARRI Lens Data System (LDS), additional outputs, lens synchronization for 3D, and built-in position and motion sensors and a 4:3 sensor making it ideal for anamorphic cinematography.

Alexa M
The Alexa M had its imaging and processing unit broken down in two parts to be small, compact and lightweight for 3D rigs and other uses where size is a concern. A special version of the Alexa M, called the Alexa SXT-M, was created for Gemini Man.

Alexa Studio
The Alexa Studio features an optical viewfinder, mechanical shutter, and a 4:3 sensor for anamorphic cinematography.

Alexa XT
In February 2013, the range was renewed as Alexa XT (XT standing for extended technology). This range is upgraded versions of the original Alexa cameras, which are equipped with a so-called XR module, which replaces the SxS module on the cameras, and allows direct raw recording without the need for an external recorder. This module records on dedicated SSDs. Further improvements are an internal ND filter unit, a 4:3 sensor, an Open Gate sensor mode, and a quieter cooling fan. The range accordingly comprises the Alexa, the Alexa XT, the Alexa XT M, the Alexa XT Plus, the Alexa XT Studio, and the Alexa Fiber Remote. Existing cameras can be upgraded with the XR module for internal raw recording.

Alexa 65
 
On 21 September 2014 at the Cinec convention in Munich, Arri announced the Alexa 65, a 6K 65mm digital cinema camera. As with cameras from competitor Panavision, the Alexa 65 camera was available by rental only, provided through the ARRI Rental Group. The Alexa 65 uses the A3X sensor, composed of three vertical ALEV III sensors, which has a maximum recordable resolution of 6560x3100.

The first production to use the camera was Mission: Impossible – Rogue Nation, which was used to shoot the underwater sequence, and around forty percent of The Revenant.

In May 2015, Marvel Studios announced that Avengers: Infinity War and Avengers: Endgame will be shot entirely with the brand new camera, marking the first time a narrative feature film was shot entirely with a customized version of the Alexa 65 camera, Alexa IMAX 3D, as the camera had only been used to film specific scenes in Captain America: Civil War.

Alexa Mini
 
On 24 February 2015, Arri announced the Alexa Mini. It has the same sensor as the other Alexa cameras. It features in-camera recording to CFast 2.0 cards, 200 FPS and 4K UHD in-camera upscaling.

Alexa SXT
 
On 18 March 2015, Arri announced the SXT line of Arri Alexa cameras which will support in-camera upscaling of Apple ProRes to 4K resolution and Rec. 2020 color space. Arri also announced the SXR module which can upgrade XT, XT Plus, and XT Studio cameras with the SXT features.

Alexa LF

On 2 February 2018, Arri announced the Alexa LF at the BSC Expo. It is a 4K Large Format Camera. The Alexa LF's A2X sensor is based on two vertical ALEV III sensors, which are stitched together to create a seamless large format image. This is the same principle that was used to create the Alexa 65, which uses three Alexa sensors that are arranged vertically. The Alexa LF can record in Open Gate in a resolution of 4448 × 3096.

Alexa Mini LF
On 28 March 2019, Arri announced the Alexa Mini LF, which houses the same sensor as the Alexa LF inside a camera body similar to the Alexa Mini. Additional improvements over the Alexa Mini include an improved EVF (MVF-2) with larger flip-out monitor and power outputs for camera accessories. The camera also features a new Codex recording module, which accepts 1TB Codex Compact Drives. It was ARRI's top-selling camera prior to the COVID-19 pandemic.

Alexa 35 
On May 31, 2022, Arri announced the Alexa 35. It is based on a Super 35 ALEV 4 sensor, Arri's first new sensor for the Alexa family since the release of the first model in 2010. The sensor is sized 27.99 x 19.22 mm and records at a resolution of 4608 × 3164 with 17 stops of dynamic range.

Sensors

The ALEV III sensor debuted in the first Alexa model in 2010. It has 3424×2202 effective pixels used for generating an image. 2880×2160 pixels are generally used for recording on the Alexa Studio and M in 4:3 mode, and 2880×1620 pixels are used for recording on the regular Alexa and other models in 16:9 mode. The rest of the sensor is used for looking around in the viewfinder. Alternatively, the full sensor resolution may be employed in 'Open Gate' mode for resolution-demanding situations. It has a native ISO of 800 and records 14.5 stops of dynamic range.

The Alexa LF and Alexa Mini LF use the A2X sensor, composed of two vertical ALEV III sensors, which has a 36.70mm × 25.54mm active imaging area. It provides up to 4448×3096 maximum recordable resolution.

The Alexa 65 uses the A3X sensor, composed of three vertical ALEV III sensors, which has a 54.12 mm × 25.59 mm active imaging area. It provides up to 6560×3102 'Open Gate' maximum recordable resolution.

The ALEV 4 sensor debuted in 2022 with the release of the Alexa 35. It is sized at 27.99 x 19.22 mm and records at a resolution of 4608 × 3164 with 17 stops of dynamic range.

Recording media
The Arri Alexa can record to 1920×1080 ProRes 422 or ProRes 4444 on SxS Cards or 2880×1620 ARRIRAW to external recording devices. The Arri Alexa Firmware 7 increases the resolution on the SxS cards to 2k ProRes 4444 (previously 1080p)

ArriRaw
ArriRaw is a raw codec similar to CinemaDNG that contains unaltered Bayer sensor information.  The data stream from the camera can be recorded via T-link with certified recorders like those from Codex Digital or Cineflow.

Reception
According to cinematographer Roger Deakins, Alexa's tonal range, color space, and latitude exceed the capabilities of shooting in film. "This camera has brought us to a point where digital is simply better", says Deakins. Deakins used the camera to shoot In Time, the James Bond film Skyfall, Prisoners, Unbroken, Sicario, The Goldfinch, Empire of Light, and the Academy Award for Best Cinematography winners Blade Runner 2049  and 1917.

The Alexa is the dominant camera in the professional film industry, and was used as the primary system on over 70% of the top 100 grossing films since 2016. Since its introduction, eight movies shot on Alexa (Argo, Birdman, Spotlight, Moonlight, The Shape of Water, Green Book, Parasite, and Nomadland) won an Academy Award for Best Picture. Also, movies shot on Alexa won Academy Award for Best Cinematography ten times, including five in a row between 2011 and 2015, for Hugo, Life of Pi, Gravity, Birdman, The Revenant, Blade Runner 2049, Roma, 1917, and Dune.

Similar cameras
 Arriflex D-20 and D-21
 Panavision Genesis, released in 2005
 RED Digital
 Sony CineAlta
 Panasonic VariCam
 Blackmagic URSA

References

External links

Frameline Generator Advanced | FLAG – free web tool for creating highly customized framelines for the ALEXA and AMIRA family of digital cameras
metavisor – free browser viewer for Arri Raw metadata

Cameras introduced in 2010
Digital movie cameras
Film and video technology